Athlete activism in the United States refers to the use of one's platform as a professional athlete to advocate for social and political issues. It has been a prominent aspect of American sports culture for decades, dating back to the civil rights movement of the 1960s, with athletes such as Muhammad Ali and Tommie Smith using their fame to speak out against racism and discrimination. In recent years, athlete activism has gained renewed attention as athletes have used their platforms to address issues such as police brutality, racial inequality, and LGBTQ rights. The intersection of sports and social justice has been a contentious topic, with some praising athletes for using their influence to bring attention to important issues, while others criticize them for being "political" or "divisive." Despite this, athlete activism has played an important role in shaping public discourse and bringing attention to important issues in the United States.

National Football League 
The National Football League (NFL) has seen activity in many areas of activism such as the United States military, the Black Lives Matter movement and aspects of feminism.

Colin Kaepernick was the first major activist of the Black Lives Matter movement in the NFL. Colin Kaepernick started his protest in 2016 to raise awareness towards people of color and more specifically black people in America by sitting on the bench and kneeling during the National Anthem. After catching the eye of American Football fans around the world, he was told by one of his teammates that it would be more respectful to take a knee. Colin's actions continued to capture attention and gained more popularity after every game. The attention had both positive and negative reactions with both the program as well as the players beginning to partake. Many people around the United States were angry because the National Anthem is often seen as something that is representative of the United States and its military. While he was taking a knee, many people believed that it was disrespectful to the military and all of those who served their country, while other people saw it as a way of bringing awareness to racism in America.

Olympics 

The Olympics, especially in more recent years, has been a major source of political outcry/protest from its’ competitors. The earliest example of said outcry was in the 1968 Olympics, where Tommie Smith and John Carlos raised their fists in a salute to Black Power on the podium, sparking a massive chain of repercussions and respect.The assassination of Martin Luther King Jr, the many advancements in the U.S. Civil Rights Movement, and a recent mass shooting prior on October 2nd, influenced the pair of athletes to make their bold political statement. Wearing a black T-shirt to cover the USA on their uniforms, and raising a black glove in the air as the Star Spangled Banner played, the outcry was largely negative and near-instant. The two men were banned from the US team and received countless death threats for their act of peaceful protest, and their lives took a drastic turn for the worse. But with approximately 400 million people viewing it, both in person and through television, it was no doubt effective. 40 years later, in 2008, President Barack Obama acknowledged the men’s protest, and asked the men to become U.S. Olympic Committee ambassadors in 2016.

Protests like these have made a resurgence more recently, in the 2022 Beijing winter games. Many athletes are unhappy with the International Olympic Committee’s decision to place the winter games in China, with the country’s history of human-rights violations and staunch censorship policies.As such, protests have become a lot more hushed down, as the IOC has learned from past protests on the podium. From athletes skipping the opening ceremony, to some athletes turning away from the flag during the national anthem, the IOC’s controversial Rule 50 preventing all forms of peaceful protest on the podium has made it even riskier to make a political statement, as its led to termination and massive controversies for the Olympians that dare to use their Olympic feats to make their voice heard.

Major League Baseball 
The MLB is a primary example of professional athletes using their platform in order to advocate for social and political issues. The main player credited with jumpstarting activism within Major League Baseball is Jackie Robinson. Robinson became the first player to break the color barrier in the MLB on April 15, 1947. Once established in the MLB, Robinson found many friends in high positions that he would communicate his feelings about specific civil rights issues such as lynching or the passing of certain legislation. Although he became frustrated with democracy and the lack of influence the Civil Rights Movement had made so far, he continued to fight for justice until throughout his life. The courage and leadership shown by Robinson seeped through the MLB into other sports as more and more African American athletes began to fight for social injustice. Robinson serves as a great example of athlete activism and was a primary catalyst for changing the course of direction for Major League Baseball. 

Another example of athlete activism within the MLB is Roberto Clemente. Clemente was the first Latino Hall of Famer in baseball who received: 12 Golden Glove awards, over 3,000 hits, 15 all-star appearances, 2 World Series titles, and the 1966 MVP. After leaving his home country of Puerto Rico to go play in the MLB in 1955, Clemente immediately noticed the segregation and racism within America as Jim Crow was in full effect. Clemente would begin a fight against oppression that would include things such as boycotting bus trips with teammates to “all white” diners during road trips or forcing Pittsburgh Pirates General Manager to buy station wagons for non-white players to travel in during away games. You see former Major leaguer Carlos Delgado follow in his idol’s footsteps by continuing to fight for activism in both minorities and other issues of social justice just as Clemente did. Clemente created a new form of activism to fight social injustices within the MLB, which has helped shape the league into what it is today.

National Basketball Association 
LeBron James is considered by most people to be one of the greatest players in the history of the NBA. And, throughout his career, James has made it a focus to better the world around him. Despite this, James has faced racism during his NBA career. Since Kaepernick took the knee, James has followed in his footsteps, but led in his own way and in his own sport. Despite being told to "shut up and dribble," James has continued to be an activist against racism by taking action on social media and during the pregame of NBA games. The use of his high platform allows more people to follow or hear about his activism. At the 2016 ESPYs, James and a few fellow NBA players used their platform to express their support toward the Black Lives Matter Movement. James has used his platform more every year as he gains more popularity, and his platform continues to grow.

Social media 
With exponential technological advancements occurring in the last few decades, professional athletes are now able to reach and engage with a global audience. While athletes serve as a major source of entertainment, they are becoming agents of social change, using their large followings on social media to spread messages. With their powerful personalities and high-statuses, prominent athletes become key influencers for social change, holding the power to sway and challenge opinions to fight social injustices occurring. 

Social media is a powerful tool in the world of activism, even outside the sports sphere. Its various platforms provide an avenue in which athletes can directly engage with the public. It is within these platforms that have become the main arena for sports consumers to interact with one another, share their opinions, and respond to athletes themselves. This allows for an ongoing conversation between sports organizations, athletes, media sources, and consumers/audiences.

LeBron James is a salient example of an athlete using their platform to push change. He has a sizable social media following, with about 53 million followers on Twitter and 144 million followers on Instagram (as of February 2023). Though not in his job description or duties, he frequently shares content that is outside his realm of sports. He uses his social media presence to share opinions regarding politics, social justice issues, and other activist movements. He once stated, "We know it's bigger than us. It's not about us. I'm going to continue to do what I have to do to play this game I love to play, but this is bigger than me playing the game of basketball".

In June of 2020, a group of NFL players created a video titled, "Stronger Together." This video acted as a call to condemn racism and police brutality following the murder of George Floyd in May of 2020. The video includes many big name athletes, including Odell Beckham Jr., Patrick Mahomes, Deshaun Watson, and more. After each player (and others not featured in the video) posted the video on their personal platforms, the media quickly circulated through social media platforms, and became a key piece of athlete activism. With the attention and engagement the video received, it was eventually reposted on behalf of the National Football League.

Feminism 
Sexual harassment, assault, discrimination, and judgment on the basis of sex have impacted women and female sports for hundreds of years. In the world of sports, women have faced numerous challenges when attempting to be seen as equal to their male counterparts because there is a stereotype deeply rooted in the sports industry that women are incapable of being as physically strong or capable as men. Because of this, female athletes competing in competitive sports have used their public outreach to spread awareness of the discrimination they face. Whether that is through public displays or simply out-doing men in certain sports, women have proven that they are willing to exceed societal standards and expectations.

In the 1997 Olympics, Kerri Strug was the U.S. gymnast who proved she could compete despite her physical statistics. She was four-foot-nine, weighing in at ninety pounds, and was highly doubted by fans and fellow competitors. In the middle of the competition, Russia was ahead of the United States, so the team depended on an impaired Strug. Her coach encouraged her to complete the final vault to bring home the gold medal for the United States, which she executed successfully. Following her win, the United States women's team, oftentimes referred to as the "Magnificent Seven", refused to walk on the stage without their injured teammate, so they carried her out. This event was an example of how women were able to come together in the face of adversity to showcase a sense of unity for other female athletes all over the world. Following her time in the Olympics, Strug was inducted into the International Jewish Sports Hall of Fame and was also still involved in sports as a spectator and influential figurehead.

In an article written by Erin Gwydir for the University of Tennessee's independent newspaper The Daily Beacon, she states, "Sports bring out the primitive overvaluing of men’s physical nature to women’s into a relation to patriarchal representation, strength, and overall respect." This is a powerful and relevant statement that speaks to the issue of discrimination towards women in national sports because it is a disadvantage that is continuously perpetuated. As of late, women are using their exposure to the public eye to speak out about the discrimination and harassment they have faced during their time in the sports industry. An example of this would be the MeToo movement, which is a social movement that highlights the sexual abuse, harassment, and discrimination that women have dealt with and allows them to address the public about it. Olympic gold medal gymnast Aly Raisman has been to various universities and conferences to talk about her personal experience with sexual abuse and discrimination that she has endured since she was fifteen years old. Namely, she recounts the traumatic incidents of sexual abuse that she had to deal with from Larry Nassar, a former United States Gymnastics physician. Following her initial statement in 2017, several other renowned gymnasts followed in her footsteps, including Gabby Douglas and Simone Biles.

These are prime examples of the unification of female athletes in the United States and how they were able to connect, support, and uplift each other over a common cause. It should be mentioned that feminism has drastically changed from how we know it today. In the late 1960s and early 1970s, feminism was centralized around equality and promoting the idea that women are adept enough to compete with men. Today, Western feminism is believed to focus more on the differences between men and women, causing a greater divide rather than equality. Taking this into account, it is important to remember that these concepts have the ability to change drastically over the years, so many people are waiting for the next movement or outcry that furthers women's equality in the world of sports. Through public displays of feminism in United States sports, women are feeling more comfortable with competing and speaking out about the hardships they have had to endure.

References 

Wikipedia Student Program
Civil rights in the United States
Sports culture
Activism
Sports in the United States